Voices of Theory is the only studio album by American contemporary R&B group Voices of Theory; released in 1997 via H.O.L.A. Recordings (which was distributed via PolyGram). The album did not chart on the Billboard 200, but it peaked at #56 on the Billboard R&B chart and #32 on the Billboard Heatseekers chart in 1998.

Three singles were released from Voices of Theory: "Somehow", "Say It" and "Wherever You Go". The latter two singles peaked at #10 and #36 on the Billboard Hot 100 in 1998, respectively.

Track listing

Chart positions

References

External links
 
 

1997 debut albums
Albums produced by John Benitez
Contemporary R&B albums by American artists
PolyGram albums